Adrian Wojnarowski (born March 4, 1969), nicknamed Woj, is an American sports columnist and reporter. He is an NBA insider for ESPN, having previously covered the NBA for Yahoo! Sports.

Personal life
Wojnarowski was born in Bristol, Connecticut on March 4, 1969, of Polish descent. He graduated from Bristol Central High School in 1987.  He then went on to attend St. Bonaventure University, where he graduated in 1991. He currently lives in Glen Rock, New Jersey with his wife, Amy, and two children. In May 2022, Wojnarowski received an honorary doctorate from St. Bonaventure University.

Career
Wojnarowski began his career working for the Hartford Courant starting as a high school senior and continuing during breaks from college. After graduating from college, he wrote for some smaller papers before becoming a columnist for the Fresno Bee in 1995. On June 20, 2019, Wojnarowski was awarded the inaugural Tony Kubek Award for Media Excellence by the National Polish-American Sports Hall of Fame in Michigan.

In 1997, he started working for The Record in New Jersey. As a result of his work with The Record, he was named "Columnist of the Year" in 1997 and 2002 by the Associated Press Sports Editors. During this time, he also contributed regularly to ESPN.com. In 2006, he published a New York Times best-seller: The Miracle of St. Anthony: A Season with Coach Bob Hurley and Basketball's Most Improbable Dynasty.

Yahoo! Sports
In 2007, he left The Record and joined Yahoo! Sports full-time. In March 2009, he and Dan Wetzel wrote a story tying the Connecticut Huskies men's basketball program to several recruiting violations. In 2010 the New York Post reported that Wojnarowski was being sued by the Penguin Group for failing to meet a deadline for a book covering the life of coach Jim Valvano. Wojnarowski responded that the problem was "a miscommunication between my agent and me" and said that he would be returning the money to Penguin Books.

Wojnarowski has been widely considered one of the best NBA "scoopers" in the business by fans, especially during the NBA Draft, when Wojnarowski has called the picks and trades involving said picks ahead of time on his Twitter account. His scoops have been referred to as “Woj Bombs”. However, Wojnarowski has been criticized by media critics for his reporting on NBA player LeBron James, being accused of having an apparent bias and relying on anonymous sources. He was listed #1 in Sports Media Watch's Worst of Sports Media 2010 as a result of this criticism.

ESPN
Wojnarowski left Yahoo! Sports for ESPN on July 1, 2017, just before the start of NBA free agency. He made his ESPN debut on the midnight edition of SportsCenter earlier that day.

Josh Hawley incident
On July 10, 2020, Republican Senator Josh Hawley wrote a letter to NBA commissioner Adam Silver questioning the propriety of the NBA allowing social justice statements on players' jerseys, but not support for law enforcement or anything critical of the Chinese Communist Party. The NBA has business connections with China. Wojnarowski, copied on the Hawley communication, replied to Hawley via email saying "fuck you". Wojnarowski apologized the same day to Hawley and ESPN; ESPN called Wojnarowski's response "completely unacceptable behavior" and added the network was "addressing it directly with Adrian and specifics of those conversations will remain internal." Two days later, ESPN suspended Wojnarowski without pay. He was due to remain suspended for one to two weeks.

Books authored

References

External links
 
 Bio at ESPN

1969 births
Living people
American people of Polish descent
American podcasters
American sportswriters
ESPN people
St. Bonaventure University alumni
Writers from Connecticut
Yahoo! employees
People from Bristol, Connecticut